Willibrordus Adrianus Maria "Joost" Luiten (born 7 January 1986) is a Dutch professional golfer who plays on the European Tour.

Early life and amateur career 
Luiten was born in Bleiswijk and started playing golf at 6 years old at Golf Centrum Rotterdam. As an amateur, he won the 2005 Spanish Amateur Open Championship and German Amateur Open Championship.

He represented his country at the 2004 European Boys' Team Championship and was selected for the 2006 Palmer Cup.  Luiten was a member of the 2006 Dutch team that won the Eisenhower Trophy after he played his last five holes in six under par.

Professional career
After a failed bid for a tour card at Qualifying School he started his professional career on the EPD Tour where he claimed second place twice in just four starts. Because he was not in possession of a tour card Luiten was solely dependent on invites to play on the Challenge Tour.

He received one for the Tusker Kenya Open where he birdied the 72nd hole for a share of tenth place. This was enough to earn himself a start in the next tournament where he finished third. On his way to show how to make perfect use of a single invite Luiten went on to win in France, his third start of the season. In his first six events of 2007, he won two of them. On his way to winning the Vodafone Challenge he shot a 61 (-11) in the final round, the lowest final round total by a tournament winner.

After finishing sixth in the 2007 Challenge Tour rankings he received a European Tour card for 2008 and claimed two top 10 spots before injury curtailed his season.

Luiten finished second at the KLM Open, a European Tour event, in 2007 and has been the highest ranked Dutch golfer in the Official World Golf Rankings. In January 2008 he reached the top 100 in the rankings.

Luiten's 2009 season was hampered by a wrist injury that kept him out more than a year and he played the start of 2010 on a minor medical exemption. He regained his European Tour card for the rest of 2010 and finished the season 28th on the Order of Merit.

In November 2011, Luiten won his first tournament on the European Tour with a victory in the Iskandar Johor Open in Malaysia, which also gave him his highest world ranking position to that point, at 66. He finished in the top 30 of the Order of Merit for the second consecutive year, ranked 24th.

Luiten won for the second time on the European Tour in June 2013 at the Lyoness Open in Austria. He took a three stroke advantage into the final round and shot a one-under-par 71 to finish two ahead of Thomas Bjørn. He became only the second player from the Netherlands to record multiple European Tour victories, after Robert-Jan Derksen.

In 2014, Luiten won the Wales Open and finished third at the Volvo Golf Champions, sixth at the Abu Dhabi HSBC Golf Championship, fourth at the Open de España,  third at the Lyoness Open and third at the Volvo World Match Play Championship. By 24 November, he reached 28th in the Official World Golf Ranking, a high point so far. He also played in the United States, finishing 13th at the WGC-Cadillac Championship and 26th at the Masters Tournament and PGA Championship.

In the first half of 2016 Luiten collected eight top-10 finishes in 15 events, with second places in consecutive weeks at the Open de España and Shenzhen International. In August he represented Netherlands at the 2016 Summer Olympics, finishing tied for the 27th place. The following month, he went on to win for the second time the KLM Open, matching the course record with an 8-under par 63 on the final round.

Amateur wins
2004 Dutch Boys Championship, Dutch Youths Championship
2005 Spanish International Amateur Championship, German Amateur Open Championship

Professional wins (9)

European Tour wins (6)

*Note: The 2011 Iskandar Johor Open was shortened to 54 holes due to weather.
1Co-sanctioned by the Asian Tour

European Tour playoff record (1–0)

Challenge Tour wins (2)

Alps Tour wins (1)

Results in major championships
Results not in chronological order in 2020.

CUT = missed the half-way cut
"T" = tied for place
NT = No tournament due to COVID-19 pandemic

Summary

Most consecutive cuts made – 3 (2011 Open Championship – 2012 PGA)
Longest streak of top-10s – 0

Results in The Players Championship

"T" indicates a tie for a place

Results in World Golf Championships
Results not in chronological order before 2015.

QF, R16, R32, R64 = Round in which player lost in match play
"T" = tied

Team appearances
Amateur
European Boys' Team Championship (representing the Netherlands): 2004
European Amateur Team Championship (representing the Netherlands): 2005
European Youths' Team Championship (representing the Netherlands): 2006
Bonallack Trophy (representing Europe): 2006 (winners)
Eisenhower Trophy (representing the Netherlands): 2006 (winners)
Palmer Cup (representing Europe): 2006 (winners)

Professional
World Cup (representing the Netherlands): 2011, 2016, 2018
Seve Trophy (representing Continental Europe): 2013 (winners)
EurAsia Cup (representing Europe): 2014 (shared)

See also
2007 Challenge Tour graduates

References

External links

Dutch male golfers
European Tour golfers
Olympic golfers of the Netherlands
Golfers at the 2016 Summer Olympics
Sportspeople from South Holland
People from Lansingerland
1986 births
Living people
21st-century Dutch people